The Clariden is a mountain in the Glarus Alps, located at an elevation of  between the Swiss cantons of Uri and Glarus. The Hüfifirn on the west is drained by the Chärstelenbach, a tributary of the Reuss that eventually flows into Lake Lucerne. The Claridenfirn on the east is drained by the Linth that eventually flows into Lake Zürich.

The mountain lies in the municipalities of Silenen and Spiringen, in the canton of Schwyz, and Glarus Süd, in the canton of Glarus. The nearest settlements are the villages of Unterschächen to the north-west, and Linthal to the north-east, which lie at each end of the Klausen Pass.

References

External links

Clariden on Summitpost
Clariden on Hikr

Mountains of Switzerland
Mountains of the canton of Uri
Mountains of the Alps
Alpine three-thousanders
Mountains of the canton of Glarus
Glarus–Uri border